Manfred D. Steger (born 1961) is a professor at the University of Hawaii at Manoa. He was also Professor of Global Studies and Director of the Globalism Research Centre at RMIT University in Australia until 2013.

Background
Steger was born in Austria and left there in 1986 to study in the United States. He earned a PhD in political theory and comparative politics at Rutgers University in 1995.

As of 2013, Steger is a member of the editorial board of the American Political Science Review, the research journal of the American Political Science Association.

Scholarship
Steger's research and teaching spans globalization, ideology, and non-violence.

Steger won the 2003 Michael Harrington Award with his study on Globalism: The New Market Ideology (Rowman & Littelfield, 2002).

WorldCat (Worldcat Identities) lists sixteen of his works which have achieved a global library presence of more than 300 global libraries.

Festschrift by Palgrave Macmillan 

The international publisher Palgrave Macmillan published in 2019 a Festschrift on Steger's work. The book "Revisiting the Global Imaginary. Theories, Ideologies, Subjectivities: Essays in Honor of Manfred Steger
Editors: Chris Hudson, and Erin Wilson. Palgrave Macmillan say:

"Manfred B. Steger’s extensive body of work on globalization has made him one of the most influential scholars working in the field of global studies today. His conceptualization of the global imaginary is amongst the most significant developments in thinking about globalization of the last three decades. Revisiting the Global Imaginary pays tribute to Steger’s contribution to our intellectual history with essays on the evolution, ontological foundations and methodological approaches to the study of the global imaginary."

Bibliography 
 Justice Globalism: Ideology, Crises, Policy (with James Goodman and Erin K. Wilson).London: Sage Publications, 2013.
 Steger, M., & James, P. (2019). Globalization Matters. In Globalization Matters: Engaging the Global in Unsettled Times (pp. I-Ii). Cambridge: Cambridge University Press.
The rise of the global imaginary: political ideologies from the French Revolution to the global war on terror, Oxford University Press, 2008.
Judging nonviolence: the dispute between realists and idealists, Routledge, 2003.
Globalization: a very short introduction, Oxford University Press, 2003, 2nd edition, 2009.
Globalism: the new market ideology, Lanham: Rowman & Littlefield, 2002, 2nd edition, 2005, 3rd edition, 2009.
Gandhi's dilemma: nonviolent principles and nationalist power, St. Martin's Press, 2000.
The quest for evolutionary socialism: Eduard Bernstein and social democracy, Cambridge University Press, 1997.

Co-author
Neoliberalism, by Manfred B. Steger and Ravi K. Roy, Oxford University Press, 2010.
Ideologies of globalism, edited by Paul James and Manfred B. Steger, Sage, 2010
Rethinking globalism, edited by Manfred B. Steger, Lanham: Rowman & Littlefield, 2004.
Social capital: critical perspectives on community and "Bowling alone", edited by Scott L. McLean, David A. Schultz, and Manfred B. Steger, New York University Press, 2002.
Grassroots Zen, by Manfred B. Steger and Perle Besserman, Tuttle Publishing, 2001.
Violence and its alternatives: an interdisciplinary reader, edited by Manfred B. Steger and Nancy S. Lind, Macmillan, 1999.
Engels after Marx, edited by Manfred B. Steger and Terrell Carver, Manchester University Press, 1999.
Selected writings of Eduard Bernstein, 1900-1921, edited, translated, and with an introduction by Manfred Steger, Humanities Press, 1996.
Crazy Clouds: Zen radicals, rebels, and reformers, by Perle Besserman and Manfred Steger, Shambhala, 1991.

References

External links
 Steger entry at OCLC Classify
 Steger entry at Google Scholar

Living people
University of Hawaiʻi faculty
1961 births
Austrian political scientists
Austrian sociologists
Cross-cultural studies
Austrian emigrants to the United States